Hayk Hrachyayi Marutyan (born December 18, 1976) is an Armenian actor, comedian, screenwriter, producer and politician. He was the mayor of Yerevan from October 2018 to December 2021.

Marutyan rose to prominence as half of the comedy duo "Hayko Mko" (with Mkrtich "Mko" Arzumanyan) in the 2000s. They co-produced Kargin Haghordum (2002–09) and Kargin Serial (2010-13). Due to these, he is widely known as Kargin Hayko to the Armenian public. He later starred in several comedy films, including Super Mother and Love Odd.

Marutyan became actively involved in civic activism during the presidency of Serzh Sargsyan. During the 2018 revolution he actively supported Nikol Pashinyan. He joined Pashinyan's Civil Contract party and was nominated as their candidate for mayor of Yerevan. He was elected mayor in a landslide victory by garnering some 81% of the votes. Marutyan became the first mayor of Yerevan to be removed by a vote of no confidence by the Yerevan City Council in December 2021 amid political disagreements with the ruling government and Civil Contract party, which he left in December 2020.

Life 
Marutyan was born in Yerevan on December 18, 1976. He graduated from Anania Shirakatsy Lyceum and then continued his education at the Yerevan Polytechnic, graduating in 1997. He later served his mandatory military conscription at a special unit of the National Security Service until 1998.

Marutyan is married to Iva, a Czech national whom he met in 2004. They have 4 children (2 daughters and 2 sons).

Career 
From the mid-1990s, Marutyan worked as a screenwriter, director, and an actor. In 2002, he founded Kargin Studio, producing the TV series Kargin Haghordum (2002–09) and Kargin Serial (2010-13). He starred with Mkrtich Arzumanyan (Mko).

Political career

Activism 
Marutyan participated in social and political movements from the early 2010s. In 2011 he supported the Mashtots Park Movement. In July 2013, he was among celebrities which participated in the public transportation fare increase protests. In April and May 2018 Marutyan supported opposition leader Nikol Pashinyan during the 2018 revolution.

Mayor of Yerevan 
Election 
On July 30, 2018, Marutyan was named by Civil Contract as their candidate for mayor of Yerevan after the resignation of Republican Taron Margaryan. He was elected the mayor of Yerevan on September 23, 2018. It was widely seen as, primarily, an electoral test for the post-revolutionary Pashinyan government. The alliance which Marutyan led was called My Step, a reference to the revolution. Apart from Pashinyan's Civil Contract, it included civil society members sympathetic to the revolution.

Waste management
Marutyan first year in office was marked with a trash collection problem and a war of words with Sanitek, a Lebanese company responsible for the city's trash collection. It culminated in Marutyan unilaterally terminated all contracts with the company in October 2019 after fining it several times. The company had effectively stopped operating in August 2019. In July 2019 Armenia's State Revenue Committee opened a criminal investigation against Sanitek. The Prosecutor General’s Office announced in September 2019 that Sanitek and former city authorities had caused financial damage to Yerevan in the amount of AMD 5.3 billion ($11.1 million). Sanitek, in turn, alleged to be under "aggressive administrative pressure."

In April 2019, the Yerevan municipality set up a public-run agency to gradually replace Sanitek, which effectively occurred in September 2019.

Green spaces
Marutyan vowed to add more green spaces in Yerevan, including removing illegally built properties on formerly green spaces. In March 2019 two cafes near the Opera Theater were demolished to make way for a lawn and trees.

Transportation
Marutyan had vowed to replace Yerevan's public transportation system with a new one within two to four years. According to the reform plan, all marshrutkas will be taken off and replaced by 845 buses and 101 trolley buses.

Filmography 
Marutyan starred in more than 10 movies and TV shows. He worked for Sharm company from 1996 to 2002 as a scriptwriter, director. As an actor, he played in 220 Volt (1996), Valyur (1996), Our Yard (1996), Our Yard 2 (1998), Tuyn Kaset (2000), Urish Kaset (2000), Banda (2000), and Komertsion Nerkayatsum (2001). His most popular films are Super Mother and its sequel Super Mother 2, where he plays a woman, Karine Barseghyan.

Roles

References 

	

1976 births
Living people
Armenian male film actors
20th-century Armenian male actors
21st-century Armenian male actors
Armenian male stage actors
Mayors of Yerevan
21st-century Armenian politicians